WCJC (99.3 FM) is a radio station broadcasting a country music format. Licensed to Van Buren, Indiana, United States, the station serves the Ft. Wayne area.  The station is currently owned by Hoosier AM/FM LLC, formerly Mid-America Radio Group, Inc.

The station's line-up includes Big John (John Morgan) in the mornings (5–10am), Ben Rutz from 10am to 2pm, And Paisley Dunn (2–7pm) and The Big Time with Whitney Allen from 7pm to Midnight. WCJC carries Fox News in the morning and local news with Ed Thurman throughout the day.

References

External links

CJC
Country radio stations in the United States
Grant County, Indiana